Zsolt Kiss (born 29 March 1989 in Budapest) is a Hungarian male curler.

On the international level, he is a two-time World mixed doubles curling champion (2013 and 2015).

On the national level he is six-time Hungarian men's curling champion (2011, 2012, 2015, 2016, 2018 and 2020), six-time Hungarian mixed curling champion (2012, 2013, 2014, 2015, 2016 and 2018), eight-time Hungarian mixed doubles curling champion (2012, 2013, 2014, 2015, 2016, 2018, 2020 and 2021), one-time Hungarian junior men's curling champion (2009) and four-time Hungarian Men's Curler of the Year (2012, 2015, 2016 and 2017).

Teams and events

Men's

Mixed

Mixed doubles

References

External links

1989 births
Living people
Hungarian male curlers
World mixed doubles curling champions
Hungarian curling champions
Sportspeople from Budapest